Riksarkivet may refer to:

National Archives of Sweden
National Archives of Norway
National Archives of Finland (in Finnish 'Kansallisarkisto')

See also 

Danish National Archives (Danish: 'Rigsarkivet')